Walter Raudaschl (born 17 November 1954 in Sankt Gilgen am Wolfgangsee) is a sailor from Austria, who represented his country at the 1976 Summer Olympics in Kingston, Ontario, Canada as crew member in the Soling. With helmsman Hubert Raudaschl and fellow crew member Rudolf Mayr they took the 17th place.

Sources
 

Living people
1954 births
Sailors at the 1976 Summer Olympics – Soling
Olympic sailors of Austria
People from Salzburg-Umgebung District
Sportspeople from Salzburg (state)
Austrian male sailors (sport)